HMS Astraea was an  second class cruiser of the Royal Navy. She was built towards the end of the nineteenth century, and survived to serve in the First World War.

Construction and commissioning
Astraea was ordered as part of the eight-ship Astraea class under the Naval Defence Act of 1889. She was laid down at Devonport Dockyard in August 1890 and launched from there on 17 March 1893. She was completed and commissioned for service in November 1895.

Career
Astraea served in the Mediterranean Sea in early 1900 under the command of Captain Alfred Paget, and was in China the following year under the command of Captain Casper Joseph Baker. She left Hong Kong on 27 March 1902, homeward bound, arriving in Singapore on 2 April, Colombo on 10 April, Suez on 27 April, Malta on 2 May, and in Plymouth on 14 May, having convoyed the destroyer  from the Mediterranean. She paid off at Chatham on 12 June 1902, and was placed in the B Division of the Fleet Reserve.

She was again sent to the China Station in 1906, followed by a period at Colombo between 1908 and 1911. She returned to Britain in January 1912, where she was refitted to return to service. She was recommissioned at the Nore in June 1912, and joined the Third Fleet. By April 1913 she had been reassigned to operate off the Cape of Good Hope as part of the squadron assigned to the West Africa Station. She was serving off East Africa at Zanzibar when the First World War broke out, and the squadron was initially assigned to protect British Empire shipping travelling on the trade routes around the African coast. On 8 August 1914 Astraea bombarded Dar-es-Salaam, part of the German colony of German East Africa. Astraeas guns destroyed a radio station, and fearing an imminent landing, the German authorities scuttled their floating dock to block the harbour. This had the subsequent effect of preventing the German commerce raider  from being able to return to the port. Astraea was later one of the ships assigned to hunt and blockade Königsberg in the Rufiji Delta.

In May 1915 Astraea became the ship of the senior naval officer assigned to support the invasion of Kamerun, replacing the cruiser  in the role.

Ghostly encounter
One of Astraeas First World War officers was Harold Owen, younger brother of the wartime poet Wilfred Owen. Shortly after the signing of the Armistice, Astraea was anchored in Table Bay. Harold later wrote:

Harold only later learned that Wilfred had been killed in action on 4 November 1918, a week before he had apparently appeared to him on Astraea.

Scrapping
Astraea returned to the UK and was paid off in July 1919. She was sold on 1 July 1920 to the ship breakers Castle, but was subsequently resold and was broken up in Germany in 1920.

Notes

References

Sources
 

Astraea-class cruisers
Ships built in Plymouth, Devon
1893 ships
World War I cruisers of the United Kingdom